Buisson is a lunar impact crater that is located on the far side of the Moon. It is named after the French physicist Henri Buisson. Nearly attached to the southeast rim is the crater Vesalius. To the southwest is Einthoven. The rim of this crater is somewhat worn, and is lowest in the north. There is a low central ridge across the midpoint.

Satellite craters
By convention these features are identified on lunar maps by placing the letter on the side of the crater midpoint that is closest to Buisson.

References

External links

Buisson at the Moon Wiki

Impact craters on the Moon